MetaBass (a.k.a. MetaBass 'n' Breath) is an Australian-based hip hop crew, formed in Sydney by rappers Morganics, Baba Israel, and Elf Tranzporter. Originally busking on the city's streets they met Trent Roden from the group Slingshot who became the group's manager. Subsequent additions to the lineup included DJs Neicha and Nick Toth, keyboardist/trumpeter Adam 'Sloth' Burrell, bassist Jay Bondy, drummer Rory 'Brother Love' Toomey, MC/dancer physical linguistics and guitarist Haydn Walker.

The group self-released their debut album, Seek, in 1997 followed by several mix tapes, EPs and 12" singles culminating in the full-length release Life and Times of a Beatboxer through Bomb Recordings San Fran in 1999.

Discography
Albums
 Seek (1997) - Metaphysics

References

New South Wales musical groups